Bogandé Airport  is a public use airport located near Bogandé, Gnagna, Burkina Faso.

The airport is listed as DFEB in the official ASECNA Aernautical Information Publication for Burkino Faso but a search of the ICAO database does not confirm its 4-letter ICAO location indicator code.

See also
List of airports in Burkina Faso

References

External links 
 Official ASECNA Aeronautical Publication for Burkina Faso 

Airports in Burkina Faso
Gnagna Province